New Day Rising is the third studio album by American punk rock band Hüsker Dü, released in 1985 on SST Records.  The album continued the move away from the fast hardcore punk of the band's earliest releases toward slower, more melodic material.

Production and release
The band released the album Zen Arcade through SST Records in July 1984, and the label's co-owner Joe Carducci immediately requested another album.  The band wanted to self-produce, but SST insisted on Spot, who produced many of the label's albums, including all of Hüsker Dü's.  The recording atmosphere was thus tense.  New Day Rising appeared in January 1985 and featured slower, more melodic material, continuing the trend away from the fast hardcore punk of the band's earliest releases.  This coupled with the higher-quality musicianship and production led fans to perceive the band as more commercial, and the band defended themselves against accusations of selling out.

The album cover was shot at Hidden Beach in Minneapolis, now known as Cedar Lake East Beach, by band member Grant Hart.

Release
New Day Rising was released in January 1985 by SST Records. The album charted on the UK Independent Album Charts, peaking at 10th place.

Reception

From contemporary reviews, Spin compared the album favourably to the group's previous album Zen Arcade which was referred to as "ambitious but overreaching" and praised the songwriting, noting that "these new songs could go up against anything on the radio and blow it away" and that the group has "developed into brilliant pop songwriters." The review concluded that despite producer Spot's "characteristically cheap production", the album "doesn't just fulfill the enormous promise of the Minneapolis trio. It fulfills the even greater promise of punk rock", and that the album "affirms everything that was good about punk in the first place". Robert Christgau gave the album an A rating, opining that it was "clearly their finest record" and that audiences should "Play loud—this is one band that deserves it."

The album was included in end of the year best-of lists, such as the NME, who placed the album at ninth place on their list of top albums of 1985. The New York Times critic Jon Pareles placed New Day Rising at third on his best albums of 1985 list.

From retrospective reviews, Stephen Thomas Erlewine of AllMusic gave the album five stars, stating that "[o]ccasionally, the razor-thin production and waves of noise mean that it takes a little bit of effort to pick out the melodies, but more often the furious noise and melodies fuse together to create an overwhelming sonic force", and that Hart and Mould "both turn in songs that are catchy, clever, and alternately wracked with pain or teeming with humor. New Day Rising is a positively cathartic record and ranks as Hüsker Dü's most sustained moment of pure power."

Aftermath and influence

New Day Rising was ranked thirteenth in [[Spin (magazine)|Spin'''s]] "100 Greatest Albums, 1985–2005". In 2014, it was ranked Fifty-first in Spin's "The 300 Best Albums of the Past 30 Years (1985–2014)".  In 2003, Rolling Stone magazine ranked the album #495 on its list of the 500 greatest albums of all time, and in 2012 pushed it up to rank 488, saying, "The Hüskers created a roar like garbage trucks trying to sing Beach Boys songs", with the album again being ranked number 428 in the 2020 edition. The magazine also included the title track in its "100 Greatest Guitar Songs" list, ranking it at 96. PopMatters included the album on their list of "12 Essential Alternative Rock Albums from the 1980s", saying "New Day Rising'' was Hüsker Dü's first full-blown alterna-rock record. It's an album that captures a thoroughly road-tested band in its prime, one invigorated by its discovery of how to balance melody, noise, passion, and power without diminishing any of those aspects".

Track listing

Personnel
Credits adapted from the liner notes, except where noted.
Hüsker Dü
 Bob Mould – vocals, guitar 
 Greg Norton – bass
 Grant Hart – vocals, drums, piano on "Books About UFOs"
Technical
 Spot – producer, engineer
 Hüsker Dü – producer
 Steve Fjelstad – engineer
 Fake Name Graphx – cover art, photography

Charts

References

Works cited

1985 albums
Hüsker Dü albums
SST Records albums
Albums produced by Spot (producer)
Albums produced by Bob Mould